Lomographa is a genus of moths in the family Geometridae. The genus was erected by Jacob Hübner in 1825.

Species include:

 Lomographa anoxys (Wehrli, 1936)
 Lomographa araeophragma (Prout, 1934)
 Lomographa buraetica (Staudinger, 1892)
 Lomographa bimaculata (Fabricius, 1775) – white-pinion spotted
 Lomographa claripennis Inoue, 1977
 Lomographa distans (Warren, 1894)
 Lomographa distinctata (Herrich-Schäffer, [1839])
 Lomographa elsinora (Hulst, 1900)
 Lomographa foedata (Warren, 1894)
 Lomographa glomeraria (Grote, 1881)
 Lomographa guttalata Yazaki, 1994
 Lomographa inamata (Walker, 1860)
 Lomographa juta (Prout, 1926)
 Lomographa luciferata (Walker, 1862)
 Lomographa lungtanensis (Wehrli, 1939)
 Lomographa margarita (Moore, [1868])
 Lomographa nivea (Djakonov, 1936)
 Lomographa notata (Warren, 1894)
 Lomographa ochrilinea (Warren, 1894)
 Lomographa orientalis (Staudinger, 1892)
 Lomographa perapicata (Wehrli, 1924)
 Lomographa percnosticta Yazaki, 1994
 Lomographa platyleucata (Wileman, 1914)
 Lomographa pulverata (A. Bang-Haas, 1910)
 Lomographa rara Yazaki, 1994
 Lomographa sectinota (Hampson, 1895)
 Lomographa semiclarata (Walker, 1866)
 Lomographa simplicior (Butler, 1881)
 Lomographa subspersata Wehrli, 1939
 Lomographa temerata (Denis & Schiffermüller, 1775) – clouded silver
 Lomographa undilinea (Warren, 1894)
 Lomographa vestaliata (Guenée, 1857)

References

 
Baptini
Geometridae genera